Minnewaska may refer to:

Lake Minnewaska (disambiguation)
Minnewaska Township, Pope County, Minnesota
SS Minnewaska (disambiguation)